Trebeta was the legendary founder of Trier according to the Gesta Treverorum.

According to a legend recorded in the 12th century, Deeds of the Treveri, the city was founded by an mythological-unrecorded prince of Assyria named Trebeta, placing the city's founding legend independent of and centuries before ancient Rome's.

Trebeta's parents were said to have been Ninus, a legendary "King of Assyria" invented by the ancient Greeks (first mentioned by Ctesias), and an unknown mother who was Ninus's wife before Semiramis. Semiramis took control of the kingdom upon his father's death and Trebeta was forced into exile, wandering through Europe before settling at Trier. His body was said to have been cremated on Petrisberg. However, there is no historical evidence that the Assyrians or an Assyrian prince named Trebeta crossed into Europe from the Middle East in Assyrian records of the time.

The German historian Johannes Aventinus disputed that Trebeta (whom he called Trever or Treiber) was the son of Ninus, claiming that he was in fact a son of Ninus' contemporary Mannus, who was supposedly the second king of Germany. Aventinus also credited Trever with building settlements at Metz, Mainz, Basel, Strasbourg, Speyer and Worms.

References
 Ilse Haari-Oberg (1994) Die Wirkungsgeschichte der Trierer Gründungssage vom 10. bis 15. Jahrhundert  (The Received History of the Saga of the Founding of Treves from the 11th to the 16th Century)
 Wolfgang Binsfeld (1984) Die Gründungslegende. (The Founding Legend) in: Trier - Augustusstadt der Treverer., Mainz, 

Specific

Legendary monarchs
Mythological kings